Malešići is a village in the municipality of Ilijaš, Bosnia and Herzegovina.

Demographics 
According to the 1991 census, the total population was 883, out of which 832 (94,22%) of the inhabitants were ethnic Serbs.

According to the 2013 census, its population was 762.

Notable people
Maya Berović, pop singer

References

Populated places in Ilijaš